George Langhorn (c. 1881 – 7 May 1934) was an English professional rugby league footballer who played in the 1890s, 1900s and 1910s. He played at representative level for England and Yorkshire, and at club level for Halifax (Heritage № 48), as a forward (prior to the specialist positions of), during the era of contested scrums.

Background
George Langhorn was born in Halifax, West Riding of Yorkshire, England.

Playing career

International honours
George Langhorn won a cap for England while at Halifax in 1905 against Other Nationalities.

County Honours
George Langhorn won caps for Yorkshire while at Halifax.

Challenge Cup Final appearances
George Langhorn played as a forward, i.e. number 10, in Halifax's 8-3 victory over Warrington in the 1903–04 Challenge Cup Final during the 1903–04 season at The Willows, Salford on Saturday 30 April 1904, in front of a crowd of 17,041.

Club career
George Langhorn made his début for Halifax on Saturday 1 January 1898, and he played his last match for Halifax on Saturday 18 January 1913.

Honoured at Halifax
George Langhorn is a Halifax Hall Of Fame Inductee.

References

External links

1880s births
1934 deaths
England national rugby league team players
English rugby league players
Halifax R.L.F.C. players
Place of death missing
Rugby league forwards
Rugby league players from Halifax, West Yorkshire
Yorkshire rugby league team players